The M. S. Swaminathan Research Foundation (MSSRF) is a nonprofit NGO trust based in Chennai, India. It develops and promotes strategies for economic growth that directly target increased employment of poor women in rural areas. Their methods maximize the use of science and technology for equitable and sustainable social development and environmental stability.  The MSSRF logo signifies continuity and change, invoking the DNA model of open-ended, many-sided, and continuous evolution.

History
MSSRF was founded in 1988 by Dr. M. S. Swaminathan, who is chairman of the foundation. In 1970, C.V. Raman, the Nobel Prize-winning physicist, urged Swaminathan to start an autonomous research centre to realize his goals of sustainable development, which he now terms the "Evergreen Revolution". In 1988, after receiving the World Food Prize, Swaminathan used the US$200,000 prize to start the MSSRF. Swaminathan also currently holds the UNESCO Chair in Ecotechnology and is chairman of the National Commission on Agriculture, Food and Nutrition Security of India. The foundation was awarded the Blue Planet Prize in 1996.

Programs
MSSRF operates in five major program areas — Coastal Systems Research, Biodiversity and Biotechnology, Ecotechnology and Food security, Gender and development, and Informatics.

See also
 Indian Council of Forestry Research and Education
 Van Vigyan Kendra (VVK) Forest Science Centres

References

External links
Prof MS Swaminathan's Inspiring Talk on Biotechnology and Food Security at BITS Pilani Rajasthan
Green Revolution Champion Prof MS Swaminathan at BITS Pilani

Non-profit organisations based in India
Environmental organisations based in India
Research institutes in Chennai
Colleges affiliated to University of Madras
1988 establishments in Tamil Nadu
Research institutes established in 1998